Basti Malook is a town in the Multan District, Punjab, Pakistan. Basti Malook, its localities and sub-towns comprise a population of around 20,000.

Basti Malook is a town situated 35 km in south of Multan. Duniya Pur is located to its east. There's Shuja Abad to its west, well known for its mangoes. In its south there is another population named Makhdoom Aali. This place is known for its Halwa, the most popular being Munawar ka Sohan Halwa.

History
Before partition, Basti Maluk and surrounding areas were largely unpopulated and consisted of uncultivated land. In order to start cultivation in this area, in 1930 British Raj settled a large number of agricultural families here. Some of them were migrated from Salt Range i.e. Khushab, Jehlum etc. Among these families which migrated here were Awans.

Educational institutions

Some government education institutions are govt high school for boys, govt high school for girls, Govt degree college for women. There are many schools and colleges in this area including:

PF Cadet School
Mujahid Model School
Ibn e qasim comrade college
Fort college
Vision college
The Educators School System
Dar-e-Arqam School System
Azeem College of Technology

Business centre

This area was totally agricultural before 2010 but since then it has gain business popularity in a short time. Now it is one of the business platforms for the businessmen. Now it is totally commercial area. The main cause of its popularity is that this town is situated at the multan lodhran highway. It also connects 4 main cities (multan, lodhran, shujabad and Dunya pur). So it is center of these great cities.

Banks

The oldest bank in this region is United Bank Limited (UBL) which is serving from many years. Later other banks established in this area are ZTBL (زرعی ترقیاتی بینک), Bank al Habib (بینک الحبیب), HBL, Askari bank limited, Ubank, and NRSP bank.

Shops
Naya Savera, Dunyapur Road, run by Hafiz Ghulam Yasin, a seasoned trader of pesticides and fertilizers.

Sajjad & Co...run by Rana Sajjad Hussain...C.E.O at GFC

Awan Autos run by Zulfiqar Ali since 1994.

Habib Scrape Dealer Dunyapur Road Basti Malook

Sath Zahid Scrape Dealer Dunyapur Road Basti Malook

Khushi Muhammad Scrape Dealer Dunyapur Road Basti Malook

Abdullah Khushi Scrape Dealer Dunyapur Road Basti Malook

Haji Bashir Auto spare parts shop, Multan Road Basti malook since 2012

Habib Seeds Corporation, Bahawalpur Road, Basti Malook, Multan

References

External links
 Satellite Images of Basti Malook

Populated places in Multan District